Carlos A. Gothong Lines, popularly known as CAGLI and formerly once known as simply Gothong Lines, is a passenger and cargo ferry company based in Cebu, Philippines. CAGLI was formerly a part of WG&A SuperFerry, a company in January 1996 which served 23 major provincial ports throughout the Philippines and was the first domestic shipping company in the country to be certified by the International Safety Management Code standard. CAGLI, William Lines and Aboitiz Shipping (Aboitiz Transport System Corporation) formed was the biggest merger in the Philippine shipping industry.

History
With a mandate from the patriarch, Don Alfredo D. Gothong, the three siblings Bowen D. Gothong, Ben D. Gothong and Brezilda Gothong Co, lead the rebirth of CAGLI with the launching of its first vessel, Butuan Bay 1, on October 3, 2002.

Positioning the company as a low-cost operator, the CAGLI President, Ben D. Gothong is helped by the fourth generation of their family who are actively involved in the day-to-day operations of the shipping operations and other affiliate businesses. They are Calvin Boniface Lee Gothong, COO of Carlos A. Gothong Lines, Inc., Clark Lee Gothong, COO of Danao Coco Palms Resort, Jade T. Gothong, COO of GT Ferry and PCDC Group.

Ports of call
Luzon
Manila
Batangas
Visayas
Cebu
Dumaguete
Mindanao
Cagayan de Oro
Butuan (Nasipit) .

Fleet

Current vessels

Roll-on/roll-off cargo

Former vessels 

 Batangas Bay 1
 Butuan Bay 1 (now Trans-Asia 5)
 Cagayan Bay 1
 Manila Bay 1
 Ozamis Bay 1
 Subic Bay 1

Terminals
 ADG Terminal Mandaue
 ADG Terminal Cagayan
 ADG Terminal Nasipit

Tug boat assistance
GT Ferry (GTF), a subsidiary of Carlos A. Gothong Lines Inc. provides ship docking services and towing assistance to all types of commercial vessels and barges in the Philippines.

 Tug 2
 Tug 3
 Tug 4
 Tug 5

Notable incidents 
 Manila Bay 1 caught fire by the afternoon of October 21 but no one was reported injured. Initial investigation revealed that the fire started inside the vessel's engine room. The cargo vessel was supposed to travel to Manila the other night but postponed its voyage due to super typhoon Lawin

See also
 List of shipping companies in the Philippines
 Aleson Shipping Lines
 Ever Shipping Lines
 2GO
 Cokaliong Shipping Lines

References

External links
 Official Website

Ferry companies of the Philippines
Shipping companies of the Philippines
Companies based in Cebu